Leptodactylus labrosus is a species of frog in the family Leptodactylidae.
It is found in Ecuador and Peru.
Its natural habitats are subtropical or tropical dry forests, subtropical or tropical moist shrubland, rivers, freshwater marshes, intermittent freshwater marshes, and canals and ditches.
It is threatened by habitat loss.

References

labrosus
Amphibians described in 1875
Taxonomy articles created by Polbot